This is a list of film directors from the Canadian province of Quebec. Most, although not all, work specifically within the context of Quebec cinema, which operates semi-autonomously from the film industry of English Canada.



A
Denys Arcand
Louise Archambault

B
Frédéric Back
Paule Baillargeon
Jean Beaudin
Louis Bélanger
Dan Bigras
Jean-Yves Bigras
Charles Binamé
François Bouvier
André Brassard
Michel Brault
Manon Briand

C
Érik Canuel
Gilles Carle
Marcel Carrière
Jean Chabot
Patricia Chica
Denis Chouinard
Denis Côté
Michèle Cournoyer
Paul Cowan

D
Fernand Dansereau
Mireille Dansereau
Patrick Demers
Rock Demers
Sophie Deraspe
Denys Desjardins
Luc Dionne
Xavier Dolan
Jacques Drouin
Georges Dufaux
Christian Duguay

E
Guy Édoin
Anne Émond
Bernard Émond

F
Philippe Falardeau
Pierre Falardeau
Robert Favreau
Denise Filiatrault
André Forcier
Claude Fournier
Yves Christian Fournier

G
Claude Gagnon
Gratien Gélinas
François Girard
Maxime Giroux
Jacques Godbout
Bernard Gosselin
David Gow
Daniel Grou
Gilles Groulx

H
Patricio Henriquez
Denis Héroux
Christopher Hinton

J
Rodrigue Jean
Michel Jetté
René Jodoin
Marie-Ève Juste
Claude Jutra
Benoît Jutras

K
Elza Kephart

L
Jean-Claude Labrecque
Stéphane Lafleur
Arthur Lamothe
Micheline Lanctôt
Christian Langlois
Michel Langlois
Stéphane Lapointe
Jean-Claude Lauzon
Simon Lavoie
Caroline Leaf
Francis Leclerc
Jacques Leduc
Jean Pierre Lefebvre
Guy A. Lepage
Robert Lepage
Maurice Leroux
Philippe Lesage
Arthur Lipsett
Jean-Claude Lord
Colin Low

M
Francis Mankiewicz
Jo Martin
Korbett Matthews
Norman McLaren
Mark Morgenstern
Stéphanie Morgenstern
Robert Morin
George Mihalka

N
Kim Nguyen

O
Alanis Obomsawin

P
Pierre Patry
Yvan Patry
Gabriel Pelletier
Yves P. Pelletier
Pierre Perrault
Aleksandr Petrov
Luc Picard
Benoit Pilon
Sébastien Pilote
Anne Claire Poirier
Léa Pool
Michel Poulette
Jean-François Pouliot

R
Tahani Rached
Mort Ransen
Jason Reitman
Daniel Robichaud
Daniel Roby
Sébastien Rose

S
Cynthia Scott
Ken Scott
Mack Sennett
Beverly Shaffer
Bashar Shbib
Yves Simoneau

T
Albert Tessier
Kevin Tierney
Ziad Touma
Ricardo Trogi
André Turpin

V
Jean-Marc Vallée
Denis Villeneuve

W
Frederick Wallace

See also
 List of Canadian directors
 Cinema of Quebec
 Culture of Quebec

External links
 Website of the Association des realisateurs et realisatrices du Québec (contains list of current Quebec directors)

 
Quebec film directors
Film directors
Quebec